Mohamad Ahmad Korhani (born 10 March 1981) is a Lebanese footballer who plays as a left-back for  club Tripoli.

Club career 
On 22 May 2018, Korhani joined Akhaa Ahli Aley from Ansar. He moved to Tripoli on 7 May 2021.

Career statistics

International
Scores and results list Lebanon's goal tally first, score column indicates score after each Korhani goal.

Honours 
Safa
 Lebanese Premier League: 2011–12, 2012–13
 Lebanese FA Cup: 2012–13
 Lebanese Elite Cup: 2012

Ansar
 Lebanese FA Cup: 2016–17

Tripoli
 Lebanese Challenge Cup runner-up: 2021

Individual
 Lebanese Premier League Team of the Season: 2007–08, 2014–15
 Lebanese Challenge Cup top scorer: 2021

Notes

References

External links

 
 
 
 
 
 

Living people
1981 births
People from Akkar Governorate
Lebanese footballers
Association football fullbacks
Safa SC players
Al Egtmaaey SC players
Al Ansar FC players
Akhaa Ahli Aley FC players
AC Tripoli players
Lebanese Premier League players
Lebanon international footballers